The arrondissement of Laval is an arrondissement of France in the Mayenne department in the Pays de la Loire region. It has 34 communes.

Composition

The communes of the arrondissement of Laval, and their INSEE codes, are:
 
 Ahuillé (53001)
 Argentré (53007)
 Beaulieu-sur-Oudon (53026)
 Bonchamp-lès-Laval (53034)
 Le Bourgneuf-la-Forêt (53039)
 Bourgon (53040)
 La Brûlatte (53045)
 Châlons-du-Maine (53049)
 Changé (53054)
 La Chapelle-Anthenaise (53056)
 Entrammes (53094)
 Forcé (53099)
 Le Genest-Saint-Isle (53103)
 La Gravelle (53108)
 L'Huisserie (53119)
 Launay-Villiers (53129)
 Laval (53130)
 Loiron-Ruillé (53137)
 Louverné (53140)
 Louvigné (53141)
 Montflours (53156)
 Montigné-le-Brillant (53157)
 Montjean (53158)
 Nuillé-sur-Vicoin (53168)
 Olivet (53169)
 Parné-sur-Roc (53175)
 Port-Brillet (53182)
 Saint-Berthevin (53201)
 Saint-Cyr-le-Gravelais (53209)
 Saint-Germain-le-Fouilloux (53224)
 Saint-Jean-sur-Mayenne (53229)
 Saint-Ouën-des-Toits (53243)
 Saint-Pierre-la-Cour (53247)
 Soulgé-sur-Ouette (53262)

History

The arrondissement of Laval was created in 1800. At the March 2016 reorganisation of the arrondissements of Mayenne, it lost 14 communes to the arrondissement of Château-Gontier and 38 communes to the arrondissement of Mayenne.

As a result of the reorganisation of the cantons of France which came into effect in 2015, the borders of the cantons are no longer related to the borders of the arrondissements. The cantons of the arrondissement of Laval were, as of January 2015:

 Argentré
 Chailland
 Évron
 Laval-Est
 Laval-Nord-Est
 Laval-Nord-Ouest
 Laval-Saint-Nicolas
 Laval-Sud-Ouest
 Loiron
 Meslay-du-Maine
 Montsûrs
 Saint-Berthevin
 Sainte-Suzanne

References

Laval